Alfred Butt was a British theatre entrepreneur.

Alfred Butt or Butts may also refer to:

Sir Alfred Kenneth Dudley Butt, 2nd Baronet (1908–1999), of the Butt baronets
Alfred Butt, manager of Palace Theatre, London

See also
Alfred Butts (disambiguation)
Butt (surname)